Grey mullet can mean any of several fish in the family Mugilidae (the mullets) and having a greyish hue:

 Flathead grey mullet, Mugil cephalus
 Thicklip grey mullet, Chelon labrosus
 Boxlip grey mullet, Oedalechilus labeo
 Leaping grey mullet, Liza saliens
 Thinlip grey mullet, Liza ramada